may refer to:

Film and television
 Space Battleship Yamato, the 1974 animated series
 Space Battleship Yamato II, a sequel to the 1970s series
 Space Battleship Yamato III, a second sequel
 Space Battleship Yamato (1977 film), a 1977 animated film 
 Farewell to Space Battleship Yamato, a 1978 animated film
 Yamato: The New Voyage, a 1979 animated film
 Be Forever Yamato, a 1980 animated film
 Final Yamato, a 1983 animated film
 Yamato 2520, an unfinished OVA from 1994
 Space Battleship Yamato: Resurrection, a 2009 animated film
 Space Battleship Yamato (2010 film), a 2010 live-action film
 Space Battleship Yamato 2199, a 2012 animated series
 Space Battleship Yamato 2202, a sequel to the 2012 series

Games
 Space Battleship Yamato (video game) by Bandai
 Space Battleship Yamato: Iscandar e no Tsuioku a video game for PlayStation 2
 Space Battleship Yamato: Nijū Ginga no Hōkai a second PlayStation 2 sequel

Space Battleship Yamato